David Sinclair (born 6 October 1969) is a Scottish former footballer who played in defence.

Career
Sinclair made most of his career appearances at Raith Rovers, where he picked up two Scottish First Division title medals, plus a League Cup winner's medal. After making over 175 league appearances for Raith, Sinclair failed to make even half that at a number of other clubs, retiring in 2001.

After the League Cup victory Raith Rovers manager Jimmy Nicholl is quoted to have said "Even Davie Sinclair was crying and he's so tough he's got tattoos on his teeth".

Honours

Raith Rovers
 Scottish League Cup: 1994–95
 Scottish First Division: 1992–93, 1994–95

Personal life
Sinclair was brought up in the village of High Valleyfield.

References

External links 
 

1969 births
Footballers from Fife
Living people
Scottish footballers
Raith Rovers F.C. players
Millwall F.C. players
Dundee United F.C. players
Livingston F.C. players
Falkirk F.C. players
Forfar Athletic F.C. players
Scottish Football League players
Portadown F.C. players
English Football League players
Association football defenders
Sportspeople from Valleyfield, Fife